Phelsuma comorensis Boettger, 1913 is a species of geckos that lives on the island Grande Comore and typically dwells on trees. It feeds on insects and nectar.

Description
This lizard belongs to the smallest day geckos. The body colour is olive green or pale green. A rost-coloured stripe extends from the nostril to the eye. A black lateral stripe extends from the eye to the hind leg. On the lower back there are brownish or red-brick coloured dots. The legs have dark spots.

Distribution
This species is only known from the island Grande Comore. It is found in higher areas (600 meters and upwards). It is not currently endangered.

Habitat
P. comorensis is often found on a variety of pantropic vegetation.

Diet
These day geckos feed on various insects and other invertebrates. They also like to lick soft, sweet fruit, pollen and nectar.

Reproduction
The females are very productive and lay up to 8 pairs of eggs per year. Juveniles reach sexual maturity after only 4–5 months.

Care and maintenance in captivity
These animals should be housed in pairs and need an enclosure with live plants and vertical bamboo shoots. A good air flow is important. In captivity, these animals can be fed with crickets, wax moth, fruit flies, mealworms and houseflies.

References

 Henkel, F.-W. and W. Schmidt (1995) Amphibien und Reptilien Madagaskars, der Maskarenen, Seychellen und Komoren. Ulmer Stuttgart. 
 McKeown, Sean (1993) The general care and maintenance of day geckos. Advanced Vivarium Systems, Lakeside CA.

Phelsuma
Taxa named by Oskar Boettger
Reptiles described in 1913